The Man from the Rio Grande may refer to:

The Man from the Rio Grande (1924 film), a film directed by Denver Dixon
The Man from the Rio Grande (1943 film), a film directed by Howard Bretherton